The Guardian is a Nigerian independent daily newspaper, established in 1983, published by Guardian Newspapers Limited in Lagos, Nigeria.

History 
The Guardian was established in 1983 by Alex Ibru, an entrepreneur, and Stanley Macebuh, a top journalist with the Daily Times newspapers, with its model copied from the original The Guardian in the UK. The Guardian was a pioneer in introducing high-quality journalism to Nigeria with thoughtful editorial content. The paper was first published on 22 February 1983 as a weekly, appearing on Sundays. It started daily publication on 4 July 1983.

During the administration of General Muhammadu Buhari, reporters Tunde Thompson and Nduka Irabor were both sent to jail in 1984 under Decree No. 4 of 1984, which suppressed journalistic freedom. On 26 August 1989 The Guardian published a long letter by Dr. Bekolari Ransome-Kuti, a human-rights activist, entitled "Open Letter to President Babangida", in which he criticized what he saw as increasing government suppression of free expression of ideas.

The owner, Alex Ibru, escaped an assassination attempt during the military regime of General Sani Abacha. On 2 February 1996 his car was fired upon and Ibru was hit. He was rushed to the hospital with one of his eyes dangling from its socket. Following Abacha's sudden death in June 1998, legal proceedings began against his son Mohammed Abacha and his Chief Security Officer Major Hamza al-Mustapha. Eventually, in December 2010 a Lagos High Court acquitted those accused of the attempt.

Content 
The Guardian is owned by a member of an ethnic minority and has a national outlook in terms of reach and content. It claims to be independent of any ethnic group, religious community, political party or other interest group. However, it has been accused of hate-mongering against the Igbo people. The Guardian is the main competitor to The Punch for advertising, although not for circulation. Unlike The Punch, it focuses on business content rather than on what the editor of The Punch refers to as "appeal to the working classes". The Guardian is read by the most educated section of the elite, while The Punch can be understood by anyone with basic literacy. Other Nigerian papers fall between these extremes. However, The Guardian has often insisted that it caters to the interests of the different segments of the society, ranging from the most educated to the barely literate. The Guardian was described by The New York Times in 1988 as "Nigeria's most respected newspaper".

References

External links
 

Publications established in 1983
Newspapers published in Lagos
English-language newspapers published in Africa
1983 establishments in Nigeria
Companies based in Lagos
Daily newspapers published in Nigeria